Virgil Charles Harris (August 4, 1911 – July 3, 1980), nicknamed "Schoolboy", was an American Negro league pitcher who played in the 1930s.

A native of Petrey, Alabama, Harris was the brother of fellow Negro leaguer Sonny Harris and brother-in-law of Negro leaguer Jesse Houston. He played for the Cincinnati Tigers in 1936. In four recorded appearances on the mound, Harris posted a 4.34 ERA over 18.2 innings. He died in Cincinnati, Ohio in 1980 at age 68.

References

External links
Baseball statistics and player information from Baseball-Reference Black Baseball Stats and Seamheads

1911 births
1980 deaths
Cincinnati Tigers (baseball) players
Baseball pitchers
Baseball players from Alabama